The Tourist Mining Train is a Spanish tourist train that travels along the historic Rio Tinto Railway, in the province of Huelva, autonomous community of Andalusia. The first railway services were started in 1994 by the Río Tinto Foundation, using historical rolling stock. The tourist train is part of the Rio Tinto Mining Park, constituting one of its most attractive elements.

The total distance covered by the tourist train is about 22 kilometers, including the round trip.

History 
In 1984, the Riotinto mining railway was decommissioned after more than a century of service, thus abandoning the infrastructures. By the end of the 1980s, the possibility of its recovery for tourism purposes started to be considered, within the rehabilitation plan of the former mining basin. Services started in November 1994, by the Rio Tinto Foundation, after partially rehabilitating the old railway line. The train initially covered a short route between Talleres Mina and Zarandas-Naya Station, but from 1997 it would be extended to Los Frailes. Plans were originally made to extend the route to El Manzano or Manantiales, but it has not happened.

Since the tourist train inauguration, it has become one of the main attractions of the Rio Tinto Mining Park, being very popular among visitors to the historic mining basin. In 2006, the tourist train transported 66,843 visitors. Because of this success, services have been extended over time, and initiatives such as the "Moon Train" — circulating on certain summer evenings — have also emerged.

Characteristics 
The tourist train is available in two types: diesel traction and steam traction. The first one travels between the stations of Talleres Mina and Los Frailes, with a route length of 22 kilometers — round trip. The second one is powered by steam traction and travels between Talleres Mina and Zarandas, running only at certain times of the year. The tourist train has passenger cars that are reproductions of originals based on 19th century designs. The Rio Tinto Mining Park currently owns the two oldest steam locomotives in Spain still operational. These are locomotives No. 14 and No. 51, built in 1875 and 1890 respectively.

Gallery

References

Bibliography

External links 

Mining in Spain
Trains
Heritage railways
Rio Tinto (corporation)
Heritage railways in Spain
Mining